Fimbristylis cephalophora is a sedge of the family Cyperaceae that is native to Australia.

It blooms between March and August and produces brown flowers.

In Western Australia it is found along creeks, streams and rivers and other damp places in the Kimberley and Pilbara regions where it grows black clay, basaltic loam and sandy soils.

References

Plants described in 1859
Flora of Western Australia
cephalophora
Taxa named by Ferdinand von Mueller